Philipp Sonn (born 11 September 2004) is a German footballer who plays as a midfielder for  club Darmstadt 98.

References

External links

2004 births
Living people
German footballers
Association football midfielders
SV Darmstadt 98 players
2. Bundesliga players